The 71st Directors Guild of America Awards, honoring the outstanding directorial achievement in feature films, documentary, television and commercials of 2018, were presented on February 2, 2019 at the Hollywood and Highland Center, Los Angeles, California. The ceremony was hosted by Aisha Tyler. The nominations for the television and documentary categories were announced on January 7, 2019, while the nominations for the feature film categories were announced on January 8, 2019.

Winners and nominees

Film

Television

Commercials

Lifetime Achievement in Television
 Don Mischer

Frank Capra Achievement Award
 Kathleen McGill

Franklin J. Schaffner Achievement Award
 Mimi Deaton

Diversity Award
 FX Networks

References

External links
 

Directors Guild of America Awards
2018 film awards
2018 television awards
2018 in American cinema
2018 in American television
2019 awards in the United States
2018 guild awards